A bandha is a kriyā in Hatha Yoga, being a kind of internal mudra described as a "body lock," to lock the vital energy into the body. Bandha literally means bond, fetter, or "catching hold of".

Maha Bandha ("the great lock") combines all the other three bandhas, namely:

 Mula Bandha, contraction of the perineum
 Uddiyana bandha, contraction of the abdomen into the rib cage
 Jalandhara Bandha, tucking the chin close to the chest

In Ashtanga Vinyasa Yoga, these three Bandhas are considered to be one of the three key principles of yoga practice.

Mula bandha
Mūla bandha is a primary bandha in traditional yoga. The earliest textual mention of mūla bandha is in the 12th century Shaiva Natha text Gorakṣaśataka which defines it as a yogic technique to achieve mastery of breath and to awaken the goddess Kuṇḍalinī.

Etymology
Mula Bandha (Sanskrit: मूल बंध) is from Mūla, meaning variously root, base, beginning, foundation, origin or cause.

Description
Gorakṣhaśataka defines mūla bandha as: 

Iyengar defines Mūla Bandha as "A posture where the body from the anus to the navel is contracted and lifted up and towards the spine". This is qualified in that the actual muscle contracted is not the sphincter muscle nor the muscle which cessates urination, but the muscle equidistant between the two.

Maehle defines it as "root lock" and further specifies that:

Mūla Bandha is a primary Bandha in traditional yoga. Iyengar likens the functionality of the Bandha and especially Mūla Bandha to "safety-valves which should be kept shut during the practice of kumbhakas". He specifies the energetic prāṇas of Vāyus engaged through Mūla Bandha as: "...Apāna Vāyu (the prāṇa in the lower abdomen), whose course is downwards, is made to flow up to unite with Prāna Vāyu, which has its seat within the region of the chest." He cautions that "Mūla Bandha should be attempted first in antara kumbhaka (retention after inhalation). The region of the lower abdomen between the navel and the anus is contracted towards the spine and pulled up to the diaphragm. He further states that "While practicing Mūla Bandha, the yogi attempts to reach the true source or mūla of creation."

Uddiyana bandha

Uḍḍīyana bandha (Sanskrit: उड्डीयन बन्ध), also called abdominal lock or upward lifting lock, is the abdominal bandha described and employed in hatha yoga, in particular in the nauli purification. It involves, after having exhaled all the air out, pulling the abdomen under the rib cage by taking a false inhale while holding the breath and then releasing the abdomen after a pause. The process is repeated many times before letting the air into the lungs, resuming normal breath.

Jalandhara bandha
Jalandhara bandha (IAST: Jālandhara bandha) is the chin bandha described and employed in Hatha Yoga.

Etymology
Jālandhara bandha comes from  Jāla, web or net and  dhara, "holding".

Description
This bandha is performed by extending the neck and elevating the sternum (breastbone) before dropping the head so that the chin may rest on the chest. Meanwhile, the tongue pushes up against the palate in the mouth.

See also
 Kundalini
 Kapalabhati
 Tummo meditation
 Mulabandhasana

References

Sources

 Iyengar, B. K. S. (1966, 1976). Light on Yoga, Thorsons.
 
 Maehle, Gregor (2007). Ashtanga Yoga: Practice and Philosophy, New World Library.  & 
 
 

 
 
 

Kriyas
Mudras
Pranayama